Denmohor is a 1995 Bangladeshi film starring Salman Shah and Moushumi.  This film is an official remake of 1991 superhit Bollywood film Sanam Bewafa.

Cast 
 Salman Shah
 Moushumi
 Wasimul Bari Rajib
 Ahmed Sharif
 Mirana Zaman

Reception
The film was well received by the audience. It has received a staggering 7.5 rating out of ten at the Internet Movie Database.

Music 
Alauddin Ali worked as the music director of this film. Lyrics are written by Moniruzzaman Monir, Gazi Mazharul Anwar, Masud Karim, Pulak Bandyopadhyay and  sung by singers like Runa Laila, Khalid Hassan Milu, Andrew kishore, Sabina Yasmin and Agun.

List of tracks

Release 
The film released on 3 March, 1995 at the festival of Eid-ul-Fitr.

References

External links 

Films scored by Alauddin Ali
1990s Bengali-language films
Bengali-language Bangladeshi films